Cemetery Crater is one of the volcanoes in the Auckland volcanic field. Hard to see even in early aerial photos due to its shallowness, it is now covered by housing. It was first recognised by Ernie Searle in the 1960s.<ref>Searle, E. J. (1961). "Volcanoes of the Otahuhu-Manurewa district, Auckland". New Zealand Journal of Geology and Geophysics. v. 4, p. 239-255.</ref> He named it because of its proximity to the cemetery in Puhinui Rd, but the Southwestern Motorway has now been constructed between the crater and the cemetery.

ReferencesCity of Volcanoes: A geology of Auckland. Searle, Ernest J.; revised by Mayhill, R.D.; Longman Paul, 1981. First published 1964. .Volcanoes of Auckland: A Field Guide''. Hayward, B.W.; Auckland University Press, 2019, 335 pp. .

Auckland volcanic field
Maars of New Zealand
Volcanoes of the Auckland Region
Ōtara-Papatoetoe Local Board Area